Bordaglia Lake is a lake at Forni Avoltri, Province of Udine, Friuli-Venezia Giulia, Italy.

Lakes of Friuli-Venezia Giulia